The 1976 South Australian National Football League season was the 97th season of the top-level Australian rules football competition in South Australia.

Ladder

Finals Series

Grand Final 

Port Adelaide were strong grand final favourites, but Sturt scored an upset win in the 1976 SANFL Grand Final, in front of a record crowd.

References 

SANFL
South Australian National Football League seasons